Livern Wellington (born 5 January 1950) is a Jamaican cricketer. He played in eleven first-class matches for the Jamaican cricket team in 1969/70 and 1970/71.

See also
 List of Jamaican representative cricketers

References

External links
 

1950 births
Living people
Jamaican cricketers
Jamaica cricketers
Sportspeople from Kingston, Jamaica